Faisal Saleh Al-Badri (فَيْصَل صَالِح الْبَدرِيّ) (born 4 June 1990 in Libya) is a Libyan footballer who plays for Al-Hilal SC as a midfielder. He is known to be the best playmaker in Libya and among the best in the Arab World. He is nicknamed Il Maestro by Libyan fans. His main attributes are his superb passing and crossing skills, vision, and free-kick taking. He was a key figure in Libya's 2014 African Nations Championship winning campaign.

International

International goals 
Scores and results list Libya's goal tally first.

References 

1990 births
Living people
Libyan footballers
Libya international footballers
Association football midfielders
2012 Africa Cup of Nations players
Al-Hilal SC (Benghazi) players
Al-Ahli SC (Tripoli) players
Libyan Premier League players
Libya A' international footballers
2014 African Nations Championship players